Olga Boettcher (1907-2002) was a Chilean politician.

She became Governor of La Unión Department in 1941. She was the first woman Governor in Chile.  This was only six years after the introduction of women's suffrage in Chile on municipal level, and eight years before suffrage on national level.

References

 https://www.diariolaunion.cl/noticia/historiasdiariosur/2021/01/olga-boettcher-la-primera-mujer-servidora-publica-de-chile

1907 births
2002 deaths
20th-century Chilean politicians
Governors of provinces of Chile
20th-century Chilean women politicians